Byte Beautiful: Eight Science Fiction Stories is a 1985 short story collection by James Tiptree, Jr.
All but one of the stories, "Excursion Fare", had previously also appeared in earlier short story collections by James Tiptree, Jr.

Contents 
 "With Delicate Mad Hands" (novella) (Out of the Everywhere and Other Extraordinary Visions, 1981.) 
 "Beam Us Home" (Galaxy Science Fiction, April, 1969.) 
 "Love Is the Plan the Plan Is Death" (The Alien Condition, 1973.) 
 "The Man Who Walked Home" (Amazing Stories, May, 1972.) 
 "Your Faces, O My Sisters! Your Faces Filled of Light!" (Aurora: Beyond Equality, 1976.) 
 "The Peacefulness of Vivyan," (Amazing Stories, July, 1971.) 
 "Excursion Fare," (novelette) (Stellar, #7, 1981.) 
 "I'll Be Waiting for You When the Swimming Pool Is Empty" (Protostars, 1971.)

External links
 

1985 short story collections
Short story collections by James Tiptree Jr.
Doubleday (publisher) books